Scaling may refer to:

Science and technology

Mathematics and physics
 Scaling (geometry), a linear transformation that enlarges or diminishes objects
 Scale invariance, a feature of objects or laws that do not change if scales of length, energy, or other variables are multiplied by a common factor
 Scaling law, a law that describes the scale invariance found in many natural phenomena
 The scaling of critical exponents in physics, such as Widom scaling, or scaling of the renormalization group

Computing and information technology
 Feature scaling, a method used to standardize the range of independent variables or features of data
 Image scaling, the resizing of an image
 Multidimensional scaling, a means of visualizing the level of similarity of individual cases of a dataset
 Scalability, a computer or network's ability to function as the amount of data or number of users increases
 Scaling along the Z axis, a technique used in computer graphics for a pseudo-3D effect
 Reduced scales of semiconductor device fabrication processes (the ability of a technology to scale to a smaller process)

Other uses in science and technology
 Tooth scaling, in dentistry, the removal of plaque and calculus
 Fouling, i.e., formation of a deposit layer (scale) on a solid surface, e.g., in a boiler; in particular, a kind of micro fouling as crystallization of salts
 Scaling rock, the removal of loose rock from a rock wall after blasting
  Scaling of innovations, a process that leads to widespread use of an innovation

Other uses
 Scaling, North Yorkshire, England
 Climbing
 Card throwing, known in magic circles as scaling
 Scaling fish, the removal of fish scales from the fish

See also
 Scale (disambiguation)
 Scaling function (disambiguation)
 Homogeneous function, used for scaling extensive properties in thermodynamic equations